The Sananikone family were a powerful conservative aristocratic family in Laos, with notable members including Prime Minister Phoui Sananikone , General Oudone Sananikone and his brother Oudong Sananikone.

History
Based in Central Laos, particularly Vientiane, the Sananikone family were often referred as the "Rockefellers" or the Kennedys of Laos. The Sananikones' owned an airline, Veha Akhat, which leased planes and pilots from Taiwan for paramilitary operations, which lend themselves easily to commerce with opium-growing tribes people, where some of their wealth came from. They are very private people and very little is known about them. Many of the Sananikone clan have changed their last name to avoid execution during the Vietnam war.

See also
Na Champassak Family

References

Laotian families
Political families
Business families